Manalapan may refer to some places in the United States:

Manalapan, Florida
Manalapan Brook, a tributary of the South River (Raritan River tributary) in New Jersey
Manalapan Township, New Jersey